St Mary's Catholic School was a Roman Catholic secondary school located in Grimsby, Lincolnshire, England. The school closed at the end of the academic year in 2010, in preparation for its amalgamation with Matthew Humberstone School to form St Andrew's College, a joint faith school which opened in September 2010. This school was renamed Holy Family Catholic Academy, a solely a Roman Catholic school, but this closed and the site reopened as Beacon Academy in September 2017.

Admissions
St Mary's accepted any student who wished to attend if they respected Catholicism. Two main sources of students were Catholic pupils from two Catholic primary schools - St Mary's on Wellington Street in East Marsh, and St Joseph's on Philip Avenue in Cleethorpes.

Grimsby is in the Diocese of Nottingham.

History
St Mary's Secondary School was originally on a site shared with the Junior School and St Mary's Church in Henage Road. In 1965 a new Secondary School was opened and was situated in the middle of the Nunsthorpe council estate in west Grimsby. It closed on 20 July 2010, merging with Matthew Humberstone school to become St Andrew's College in September 2010. St Andrew's College, based at the Matthew Humberstone Upper site on Chatsworth Place, in turn became the Holy Family Catholic Academy, and was again transformed in 2017, this time into the Beacon Academy.

Churches nearby
St Mary's Church is on Heneage Road near St Mary's primary school. There is also St Pius X catholic church  on Chelmsford Avenue in Grange, just north of the school.

Academic results
In 2009 the school came joint 7th in North East Lincolnshire, gaining 35% A* - C's. It did not have a sixth form.

References

External links
 Edubase

Defunct schools in the Borough of North East Lincolnshire
Schools in Grimsby
Defunct Catholic schools in the Diocese of Nottingham
Educational institutions disestablished in 2010
2010 disestablishments in England